Bitter Tea is the fifth full-length album by The Fiery Furnaces, released on April 18, 2006, via Fat Possum in the U.S and Rough Trade in the UK. After it leaked onto the internet on February 22, the band immediately started selling the CD on tour.

The band envisioned Bitter Tea as a loose companion piece to their previous album Rehearsing My Choir, which had released just five months prior.

Critical response

Bitter Tea received generally positive reviews that were less polarized than their previous two proper albums, Blueberry Boat and Rehearsing My Choir. At Pitchfork Media, Mark Richardson praised the "sweet, undeniable melody" of "Teach Me Sweetheart" and the poppy likeability of "Benton Harbor Blues." Heather Phares at AllMusic criticized the album for being too long and "oddly diluted," but admitted that "even if all the songs aren't uniformly great, there's something interesting about each of them."

Track listing
 "In My Little Thatched Hut" – 4:13
 "I'm in No Mood" – 3:39
 "Black-Hearted Boy" – 5:11
 "Bitter Tea" – 5:45
 "Teach Me Sweetheart" – 5:56
 "I'm Waiting to Know You" – 4:01
 "The Vietnamese Telephone Ministry" – 5:44
 "Oh Sweet Woods" – 5:25
 "Borneo" – 4:17
 "Police Sweater Blood Vow" – 2:53
 "Nevers" – 5:02
 "Benton Harbor Blues" – 7:23
 "Whistle Rhapsody" – 4:20
 "Nevers (Reprise)" (unlisted) – 5:14
 "Benton Harbor Blues (Reprise)" (unlisted) – 3:13

Backmasking
The album contains several instances of backmasking throughout.

References

2006 albums
The Fiery Furnaces albums
Rough Trade Records albums
Fat Possum Records albums